West Fork Rio Chama is a tributary of the Rio Chama in southern Colorado. The stream flows southeast from a source near the continental divide to a confluence with the East Fork Rio Chama in Archuleta County that forms the Rio Chama.

See also
 List of rivers of Colorado

References

Rivers of Colorado
Rivers of Archuleta County, Colorado
Tributaries of the Rio Grande